NGC 584 is an elliptical galaxy in the constellation Cetus. The galaxy was discovered on 10 September 1785 by the German-British astronomer William Herschel.

It is about 20 megaparsecs (60 million light-years) distant. NGC 584 belongs to the NGC 584 galaxy group, which also includes the galaxies NGC 596, NGC 600, NGC 615 and NGC 636.

See also
List of galaxies
Comet Galaxy

References

External links
 
 Deep Sky Catalog

0584
1712
-01-04-060
005663
Elliptical galaxies
17850910
Cetus (constellation)